Count Christoph Johann Friedrich von Medem (Jeannot Medem; 1763 – 1838) was a nobleman from Courland and courtier in the courts of Prussian kings Frederick the Great, Frederick William II and Emperor of Russia Paul I. His sisters were poet Elisa von der Recke and last Duchess of Courland, Dorothea von Medem.

Early life
Christoph Johan von Medem was born in the Mežotne manor, Semigallia on 13 August 1763. He was the son of a well known landlord and Reichsgraf Johann Friedrich von Medem and his second wife Luise Charlotte von Manteuffel. He had a good education and with help from his father he became a courtier in the court of the Friedrich the Great.

Career
Christoph Johann von Medem also served in Prussian army. After Frederick the Great death in 1786 he became aide of his son Frederick William II of Prussia. Later after his patron's death in 1797 he moved to St. Petersburg in the service of Paul I of Russia. He was his chamberlain and also served as ambassador in Washington in 1796-1808.
As Captain and Adjutant of the General Nikolay Raevsky Medem acquired on September 6, 1813 during the German Campaign of 1813 the Order Pour le Mérite.

Later life
After retirement he returned to Semigallia (where he owned several manors) and turned to agriculture. He married Mary Luise, a daughter of Count Peter Ludwig von der Pahlen. Their residences included :lv:Villa Medem in Mitau and the Durbe Manor near Tukums. Christoph Johann von Medem died in Mitau on 24 February 1838.

References

1763 births
1838 deaths
People from Mežotne
People from the Duchy of Courland and Semigallia
Russian commanders of the Napoleonic Wars
Recipients of the Pour le Mérite (military class)
Baltic-German people
Baltic nobility
Ambassadors of the Russian Empire to the United States
Privy Councillor (Russian Empire)